Parastatia is a monotypic moth genus in the subfamily Arctiinae erected by George Hampson in 1898. Its single species, Parastatia parnassia, described by Heinrich Benno Möschler in 1878, is found in Suriname.

References

Arctiinae